Dr. Ivan Allen Peterson DVM (1917-1967) was a veterinarian in the San Marino, Pasadena and Hollywood areas of Los Angeles County, California during the late 1940s-1960's. He is the son of Oscar Allen Peterson and Minnie Peterson born as Minnie Wilhelmina Nelson and later known as "The Packer" (of Forks, Washington). He was married to Mary Jane Weidenbacker Daniel. He is most well known for being the veterinarian and adviser for several famous Hollywood pet actors, including several of the dogs who played in the Lassie movies (1954).

In 1951, Dr. Peterson was called upon to investigate the condition of the cow residing at the Ames Mansion in Pasadena, which later became known as the Purple Cow House, as the cow became the target for vandals who threw purple paint upon it in a neighbour feud.  Dr. Peterson found the cow to be in humane conditions and was shown in the Pasadena newspaper sitting next to Bossy giving her a pat.  A book written by Mary Ames Mitchell recounts the tale.

He received mention in several articles including Time Magazine, the Star News - Pasadena, The Sikeston Herald, Stars and Stripes and Independent, Long Beach. He was also covered by the Sydney Morning Herald regarding a story wherein his office was broken into and all 30 of his dogs slept soundly while the thief, dubbed "cat burglar" in many popular newspapers, made off with $50.

Biography
Peterson was born in Forks, Washington in 1917 to farmers and pioneers Oscar and Minnie Peterson.  His mother is known as "The Packer" in Forks, having led President John F. Kennedy on a packing trip in the 1960s.  She has a State Park named after her on the Hoh River, Minnie Peterson State Park and is a notable citizen of Forks. He is of English and Swedish descent.  In 1872, his Swedish grandparents emigrated to Forks, Clallum County, Washington, U.S.. The Peterson clan originated from the Village of Ölån in Bäcke, Älvsborg, Sweden and the Nelson's from Linderöd, Kristianstad, Skåne, Sweden.

He attended Washington State University in Pullman, Washington, U.S. from 1939–1942, and graduated with honors in Veterinary Medicine.  He was a member of Alpha Tau Omega social fraternity and the Crimson Circle, an honorary for outstanding upper classmen.  He also was President of the Sphinx Club at WSU in 1939, with a full page on the yearbook. He joined the Junior American Veterinary Association in 1942 in Washington.

The following year he married his college sweetheart, Mary Jane, in 1943, in Pasadena, California, where the family set up residence.  They lived at 1100 Kewen Drive in San Marino, California from the years 1951-1953 and also in San Marino, at 2285 Huntley Circle from 1953–1967.  Dr. Peterson's first veterinary clinic was built at 28 Valley Street, in Pasadena.

References

External links
 

1917 births
1967 deaths
American veterinarians
Male veterinarians
Washington State University alumni
People from Clallam County, Washington